Holbrooke may refer to:

People
Joseph Holbrooke, English composer
Richard Holbrooke, American diplomat

Other
Holbrooke Hotel, in Grass Valley, California, USA
Joseph Holbrooke (band), British musical group

See also
Holbrook (disambiguation)